Ruud and Rud are surnames of Norwegian origin. Both are also Norwegian place names of numerous farmsteads named Rud or Ruud from Old Norse ruð meaning clearing. Ruud is also a Dutch masculine given name meaning "famous wolf" although it is also often short for Rudolf.

Ruud
 Asbjørn Ruud (1919–1986),  Norwegian ski jumper
 Barrett Ruud (born 1983), American football linebacker 
 Birger Ruud (1911–1998),  Norwegian ski jumper
 Bo Ruud (born 1984), American football linebacker 
 Casper Ruud (born 1998), Norwegian tennis player
 Christian Ruud (born 1972), Norwegian tennis player
 David Ruud (born 1980), Swedish motorcycle speedway rider 
 Edwin Ruud (1854–1932), Norwegian-American mechanical engineer and inventor
 Espen Ruud (born 1984), Norwegian football defender
 Joseph Ruud (born 1981), American professional wrestler better known as (Erick) Rowan
 Maria Ruud (born 1960), American politician and a member of the Minnesota House of Representatives
 Millard Ruud (1917–1997), legal scholar
 Ole Ruud (born 1958), Norwegian conductor
 Roger Ruud (born 1958), Norwegian ski jumper
 Sif Ruud (1916–2011), Swedish film actress
 Sigmund Ruud (1907–1994),  Norwegian ski jumper
 Tom Ruud (born 1953), American professional football player
 William Ruud (born 1952), American educator, president of University of Northern Iowa

Rud
Adolf Rüd, Hauptscharführer  in the Waffen SS during World War II
Jon Rud (born 1986),  Danish swimmer who participated at the 2008 Summer Olympics 
Nils Johan Rud  (1908–1993), Norwegian novelist, writer of short stories children's writer, and magazine editor 
Ove Rud  (1923–2007), Danish film actor

Given name
 Ruud Boffin (born 1987), Belgian footballer
 Ruud Brood (born 1962), Dutch footballer
 Ruud de Wild (born 1969), Dutch radio host
 Ruud Geels (born 1948), Dutch footballer
 Ruud Gullit (born 1962), Dutch footballer
 Ruud Hesp (born 1965), Dutch football goalkeeper
 Ruud Heus (born 1961), Dutch footballer
 Ruud Janssen (born 1959), Dutch blogger
 Ruud Jolie (born 1976), Dutch musician
 Ruud Kaiser (born 1960), Dutch footballer
 Ruud Kleinpaste (born 1952), New Zealand TV presenter
 Ruud Knol (born 1981), Dutch footballer
 Ruud Krol (born 1949), Dutch footballer
 Ruud Kuijten (born 1973), Belgian badminton player
 Ruud Lubbers (1939–2018), Dutch Prime minister
 Ruud Misdorp (born 1952), Dutch water polo player
 Ruud Stokvis (born 1943), Dutch rower
 Ruud van Nistelrooy (born 1976), Dutch footballer
 Ruud Vormer (born 1988), Dutch footballer

Other
 Ruud Heating, Cooling & Water Heating, a division of Rheem Industries

See also
 Rudolph (disambiguation)

References

Dutch masculine given names
Norwegian-language surnames